Fife Ice Arena (originally known as Kirkcaldy Ice Rink) opened in 1938.  Kirkcaldy Ice Rink was designed by architects Williamson & Hubbard. Fife Ice Arena is the home venue of the oldest ice hockey team in the UK – the Fife Flyers.  It is also a venue for public skating, figure skating, speed skating, curling and ice shows.  The arena has also hosted concerts, boxing, wrestling, motorcycle ice speedway and other events such as dog shows.

The Fife Free Press dated 2 February 1938, announced 30,000 ordinary shares at One Pound (British pre-decimal currency) (£1) each in a proposed new rink in the town—25,000 shares were offered for subscription.  On 17 February, plans to build the rink in the Gallatown were presented to, and approved by, Kirkcaldy Dean of Guild Court. The one-storey building contained seating for 4,500 and would cost £37,000 to construct. To put that figure into context the town's fire station, also opened that year, cost £15,000.

The building was to have a carcass of steel stanchions and a roof span of 145 feet without any supporting pillars except those at the extremities, making it the widest construction of its kind in Scotland at the time.

The rink's ground level would consist of an entrance hall, general office, booking office, confectioners and tobacconist, cloakroom with provision for a large restaurant, and a milk bar.  Facilities also included dressing rooms with spray baths, while immediately above the entrance was the boardroom, bandstand and manager's office.  The plans also had a touch of class—the restaurant featured Parker-Knoll chairs, curtains designed by Dame Laura Knight, as well as monogrammed cutlery.

Much of the work was carried out by local tradesmen, including plumber James Blyth, while the original sound system came from E. Donaldson of Kirk Wynd. The builder was James Ramsay of Leslie, while joiner D. Mitchell & Sons, also of Leslie, worked on the roof.

Location and transportation
Fife Ice Arena (FIA) is located on Rosslyn Street in the North East area of Kirkcaldy known as Gallatown. FIA is approximately 1 mile from the A92, 2 miles from the railway station and town centre.
 Drive: exit the A92 at the Redhouse roundabout (Kirkcaldy East & Central) and drive South on the A921  approximately 0.5 miles to the next roundabout.  Follow the A921 (Town Centre) for a further 0.4 miles.  Fife Ice Arena is on the right.
 Bus: FIA is served by the #37 and #39 – Kirkcaldy<>Glenrothes – bus services provided by Stagecoach East Scotland
 Train: Kirkcaldy railway station is served by train services operated by ScotRail one the Fife Circle Line. Kirkcaldy station is also served by London North Eastern Railway providing direct connections from towns and cities including Aberdeen, Dundee, Waverley, Newcastle, York and London.

Rink managers

Events
Other than league ice hockey, skating and curling, other notable events have occurred at Fife Ice Arena over the years.  Some of these include, but are not limited to:

NHL/International players
A number of players with NHL experience have played for Fife Flyers and other British ice hockey teams. Some of the most noted players that have skated at Fife Ice Arena are:

Improvements and upgrades
Over the years Fife Ice Arena has undergone many changes, upgrades and improvements to the venue including:

Gallery

References
 The Life and Times of Hubert Brooks M.C. C.D 
  Page # 740

External links
 Fife Ice Arena Official Site
 Fife Flyers History
 Fife Ice Arena – Gems of Fife

Indoor arenas in Scotland
Indoor ice hockey venues in Scotland
Sports venues in Fife
Curling venues in Scotland
1938 establishments in Scotland
Kirkcaldy Kestrels